Keelulur is a village in the Orathanadu taluk of Thanjavur district, Tamil Nadu, India.

Demographics 

As per the 2001 census, Keelulur had a total population of 1314 with 628 males and 686 females. The sex ratio was 1092. The literacy rate was 75.87.

References 

 

Villages in Thanjavur district